Eugene Haynes (1927–2007) was an American classical pianist, composer and music pedagogue. After graduation from Lincoln High School in 1944, where he played piano to classmate Miles Davis' trombone. He studied music at the Juilliard School in New York and with Nadia Boulanger in Paris from 1951 to 1954. He worked as a radio presenter in East St Louis, as Artist in Residence at Lincoln University, and as leader of Centre for Performing Arts at University at Southern Illinois University. He published his memoirs in 2000 which documents his many stays in Denmark during the 1950s and his friendship with writer Karen Blixen (also known as Isak Dinesen). His first and only CD came out in 2004 and his life in Denmark was documented in a temporary exhibition at Museum Amager outside Copenhagen in 2012

Biography 
Eugene Haynes was born in 1927 in East St Louis, Illinois, USA. He started playing piano at the age of 4. As a teenager he worked in a warehouse and used his lunch breaks to play a piano nearby. His bosses discovered his talent by accident and decided to pay for his musical education. He joined Juilliard School of Music in New York (where also Nina Simone initially trained as a classical pianist) and at the end of his studies he wins the 'Loeb price' for 'overall excellence in graduate studies'. After a brief period of study at Lincoln University in Missouri (a place he would return to) he continued his studies with the music pedagogue Nadia Boulanger in Paris from 1951 to 1954.

After his stay in Paris, Haynes continued seeking a breakthrough as pianist. Sponsored by the USA Information Service he went on a concert tour in Europe. During the 1950s he stayed for extensive periods in Denmark nurturing a close friendship with the writer Karen Blixen whom he met in 1952. Haynes was in regular contact with her until her death in 1962. In between his stays and concerts in Europe he also performs in the US. He debuted in Carnegie Hall in New York in 1958 and played there again in 1969. However, Haynes spent most of his career teaching and composing. He is Artist in Residence at Lincoln University (where he studied briefly after his longer stay at Juilliard in New York) from 1958 to 1974. He wins another prize in 1974 given by 'National Association of Negro Positions' and at this time also returned to St Louis, his birthplace, to contribute to the education of young music talents in his childhood neighbourhood. During 1965 to 1973 he hosted a local AM radio show. In 1979 he became leader of a Centre for Performing Arts at Southern Illinois University in East St. Louis. Finally, a CD was released in 2004 at a time where he also continues performing. He died in 2007 at the age of 80.

The best-documented period of his life and career is 1952 to 1962, notably through his memoirs published in 2000 which contains letters and diaries from those 10 years. In addition, a temporary exhibition in Dragør, Denmark in 2012, also documented his life in Denmark during the 1950s.

In Europe in the 1950s 
Eugene Haynes was introduced to the Danish writer Karen Blixen (also known under the pseudonym Isak Dinesen) by a Danish journalist, Bent Mohn, whom Haynes met during his studies in Paris. Haynes had crossed continents for work and adventure in the midst of the Cold War, and now with a base in Denmark, he continued to nurture his friendship with Blixen and her secretary, Clara Selborn, from 1952 and over the next ten years until Blixen's death in 1962. Over many holidays and work trips in Denmark, he used Selborn's house in the small fishing village of Dragør, located south of Copenhagen (while Selborn stayed with Blixen in Rungstedlund), to practice the piano, study music, and in between, travel around Europe giving concerts.

Haynes' period in Europe (1952–1962) was reopened for the public upon the publication of his diaries and letters in 2000; To Soar With Eagles. The European Travels – Remembrances of Isak Dinesen. In addition, a suitcase belonging to Haynes containing clothes and other objects was found at Clara Selborn's house in Dragør after her death in 2008. The contents of the suitcase was then turned into a temporary exhibition at the local Dragør Museum, in 2012, along with other objects placed in a model of Selborn's house. The museum had five short films produced: "The Pianist Eugene Haynes in Dragør, Denmark, and the World" (translated from Danish). The films which are narrated by curator Ingeborg Phillipsen are available on the museum's website, www.museumamager.dk, and YouTube.

In the 1950s, Haynes was sponsored by the USA Information Service program, which aimed at improving America's image abroad and countering Eastern European political and cultural influence. Given that the Cold War was "cold," it also became a battle of culture. Racial segregation and discrimination was a sensitive topic in the US, where the civil rights movement, formed half a century before, was about to gain new momentum The Information Service tried to promote the US as a non-discriminating nation, and with Haynes, they could show that Blacks do have opportunities, even as classical pianists. At the time, the terms black and classical pianist may have seemed mutually exclusive. Classical music was a trade of artistic work almost solely reserved for whites; black musicians were more commonly known to play soul, jazz, and blues. The Information Service was also trying to sell a culture-rich nation – a USA which was more than just Hollywood, cartoons, and Coca-Cola – which has classical musicians just as talented as in Europe.

A breakthrough was difficult. Haynes himself engages with this in his diaries and letters from 1952 to 1962, To Soar With Eagles, published later in his life, in 2000.

On Karen Blixen 

On the difficulties of achieving a break through as a classical pianist, Eugene Haynes wrote in one of his letters home that for his high school classmate and friend, the Black jazz musician Miles Davis, the situation was different. As Haynes said to him once in France, "He (Miles) was entering a world where no one would question his right to function. This is still far from true where black African instrumentalists are concerned (in the States) which is why I spend as much time away from home as possible"(letter to brother, 1957, page 76)

The letters and diaries reveals the warmness of his friendship with Blixen. In a diary entry titled "First meeting" Haynes writes about a walk with Blixen: "Along the way she talked about the many discussions she and Finch-Hatton had had on music. I asked if she had the gramophone he gave her in Africa. She was happy to show it to me when we returned to the house... As we said good bye, I made a quip about being a 'bit of Africa sent out' to her". (p. 28–29)

Haynes wrote in his diary about his first meeting with Blixen: "I have seldom been so curious about anyone." He further writes of Blixen, "She was a lady of La Belle Époque, one of the last of the great femmes du monde ... Had she said she had dined at the Café Procope with Diderot and the Philosophes (public intellectuals of The Enlightenment), I would have believed her". (p 28)

Haynes further quotes Blixen, who told him, "You'll have to be patient while you grow into your grace" (p. 104).  Haynes was a young man of around thirty and working for a breakthrough. By her embracing him (as a matron?), despite obvious differences, she also grounded them in a shared experience: "In some ways we are both outsiders. I in Denmark, you in the land of your birth." Haynes reflects on his relationship with her: "When Karen Blixen is interested in what you are saying, she can fix you with an almost hypnotic gaze and you are then convinced that you are at that time the most important person she knows, and what you are saying is of great moment. It is her most endearing trait" (p63).

Haynes found Denmark open and hospitable, but he also encountered stereotypes and racism. A university professor from America visiting Blixen referred to "the accent of our nigras" while at the table, and Haynes describes the situation and his discomfort in detail. Blixen had not heard the remark, but detected something was wrong. When she later asked about what happened, she was "enraged" about the guest's behaviour after Haynes had explained (p. 201–2).

Nevertheless, there were many other much more enriching gatherings and conversations, and Haynes' delight in these meetings with Blixen shines through. At a dinner in 1961, Blixen suggests a game where each guest is assigned a famous intellectual, writer, or actor/actress. Haynes had given Blixen the witty French philosopher, Voltaire, and a woman with the name Birthe got Casanova. Haynes reveals fragments of the discussion in the diaries: Casanova had insisted on superstition as necessary, whereas Voltaire (The Enlightenment man) had favoured to free men of the "monster of superstition," arguing that liberty and superstition could not go hand in hand" (p180).

In between dinners like these, Haynes could be found in blue overalls and blue trainers among the geese of Dragør and occasionally hanging out with fishermen at the harbour.

The connection to Dragør and a suitcase belonging to Haynes found at Selborn's house in 2008 leads to a local museum exhibition and another exposition of Haynes early life.

Suitcase found in Dragør 

"The Suitcase – A metaphor for willing and unwilling travellers"

Dragør Museum displayed a temporary exhibition in 2012, hosted events, and produced five short films "The Pianist Eugene Haynes in Dragør, Denmark, and the World" (translated from Danish).

The suitcase contained ordinary everyday-use belongings, like shoes and trousers and a few books – as well as keepsake objects like dried flowers in a frame. Haynes apparently wore dark blue jeans overalls in Dragør. There are blue trainers/shoes, and a hat that, according to a 1957 article written in a popular gossip magazine, Billed Bladet, ("The Picture Magazine") made him look like the local fishermen – and maybe the bohemians he hung out with as well, one could add. There are books, two refined leather cases, a pipe instrument, various paper clips, and reviews as well as photos and PR material from his tours. The Billed Bladet magazine and article is there too. A Black American female tourist is on the front, and there are more rarities inside. The vocabulary is not surprising for the time: 'Der bor en neger i Dragør,' the headline states ("There is a negro living in Dragør").

"From now on, your name is Hans. You are one of us," the local fishermen renamed and assured him. He frequents not only Karen Blixen's home north of Copenhagen in Rungstedlund, but also hangs out with locals like the Dragør-based poet, Jørgen Gustava Brandt, who Haynes describes as "a real Casanova" in a letter to his brother (p. 77). Gustava teaches Haynes Danish, a language which he came to speak alongside French. In the suitcase, there is a book on German grammar and an anthology of literature (with one text by Blixen). When it came to music, critic Isador Phillip called Haynes "one of the greatest musical talents America has produced."(cover)). Seen in that light, it is a pity that the only CD that came out late in his life is not really seen as proving and showing his talent, the curator, Ingeborg Phillipsen, has indicated, referring to conversations with reviewers and musicians in the same field.

References 

 Dragør Museum/Ingeborg Phillipsen. 'Drejebog til debat 20 September'(Script and notes for public event at museum, 2012).
 Eugene Haynes, legendary pianist, remembered Abdul, Raoul. New York Amsterdam News [New York, N.Y] 22 Feb 2007: 27. "When Eugene Haynes made his Carnegie Hall debut in 1958, one critic wrote: "Americans reading of young Van Cliburn's triumph in Moscow may well be proud of still another ambassador...," but when he died at the age of 80 in East St. Louis earlier this month, there was not one notice in the New York press."
 Obituary in St. Louis American

Classical pianists
1927 births
2007 deaths
20th-century classical pianists
Juilliard School alumni
American expatriates in France
American pianists
Southern Illinois University faculty